The Ark and the Aardvark (originally titled Noah's Ark) is a upcoming English-language Swiss computer animated adventure comedy film directed by John Stevenson and written by Philip LaZebnik and Glen Dolman. The film tells the story of an aardvark who becomes the leader of a group of misfit animals in order to bring all the animals onto Noah's Ark. The film stars the voices of Miles Teller, Aubrey Plaza, Jenny Slate, Rob Riggle, Craig Robinson and Stephen Merchant.

Premise
The story follows an outcast aardvark by the name of Gilbert, who becomes the reluctant leader of a ragtag group of misfit animals that need to be led to the mighty ark before the impending flood. Along their journey, they band together to conquer unforeseen obstacles, and ultimately, Gilbert discovers within himself the inner strength and ingenuity to prove that in a world of "twos", he was truly destined to be "the one".

Cast 
 Miles Teller as Gilbert, an aardvark
 Aubrey Plaza as Brain, an intelligent spider
 Jenny Slate as Mitzy, a clumsy ostrich
 Rob Riggle as Todd, a short-tempered elephant who is the captain of the ark
 Craig Robinson as Clyde, an arrogant frog
 Stephen Merchant as Croc, an evil crocodile
 John Stevenson as Sparky, a honey badger who accompanies Gilbert

Production 
It was announced that Unified Pictures would produce a $35 million budgeted computer animated film, Noah's Ark, which Philip LaZebnik would write the screenplay, with ElectroAge handling the animation. In March 2013, the studio hired Kung Fu Pandas director John Stevenson to handle the creative work on the film with Cameron Hood as co-director. While later on August 20, 2014, it was reported that Stevenson had been hired as the director of the film, which had a script from LaZebnik and Glen Dolman. On October 3, 2016, Miles Teller was set to voice the lead character Gilbert in the film, now titled The Ark and the Aardvark, which Keith Kjarval and Kurt Rauer would produce the film for Unified.

In October 2016, the film's production started in Los Angeles. The film is financed by I Do Culture Corporation, which is funded by the Zhejiang-based diamond brand Hiersun（恒信).The animation is handled at Stellar Creative Lab in Vancouver.

References

External links 
 

Upcoming films
American computer-animated films
American children's animated comedy films
Animated adventure films
Fictional aardvarks
Chinese animated films
Chinese children's films
Films about spiders
Noah's Ark in film
Canadian animated feature films
Animated films about birds
Animated films about elephants
Animated films about reptiles
Films directed by John Stevenson
Films with screenplays by Philip LaZebnik